Middle Mountain is a mountain in the Sierra Nevada mountain range to the west of Lake Tahoe in the Desolation Wilderness in El Dorado County, California. The mountain is east of the Crystal Range and Rockbound Valley, and west of Emerald Bay and Lake Tahoe.

References 

Mountains of the Desolation Wilderness
Mountains of El Dorado County, California
Mountains of Northern California